|}

The Rochestown Stakes is a Listed flat horse race in Ireland open to thoroughbreds aged two years only. It is run at Naas over a distance of 6 furlongs (1,206 metres), and it is scheduled to take place each year in late May or early June.

The race was first run in 1993.  It was run at Leopardstown until 2004 and at Cork from 2005 until 2010.

Winners

See also
 Horse racing in Ireland
 List of Irish flat horse races

References
Racing Post:

Flat races in Ireland
Naas Racecourse
Flat horse races for two-year-olds